Atsaphangthong is a district (muang) of Savannakhet province in southern Laos.

References

Districts of Savannakhet province